The Archdiocese of Gdańsk is an archdiocese located in the city of Gdańsk in Poland.

According to the church statistics Sunday mass attendance was 38.1% in 2013 making it lower than the Polish average of weekly mass attendance (39.1%).

Its Archcathedral Basilica of The Holy Trinity, Blessed Virgin Mary and St Bernard in Gdańsk is listed as a Historic Monument of Poland.

History

After World War I and restoration of independent Poland, the city of Gdańsk (Danzig) was not restored to Poland from Germany, but rather turned into a free city according to the Treaty of Versailles. The Catholic congregation west of the Vistula belonged to the Diocese of Chełmno, which was restored to Poland and east of the Vistula to the Diocese of Warmia, which remained part of Weimar Germany in the interbellum. Germans within the administration of the Diocese of Chełmno were replaced by Polish priests and the Polish language was implemented as binding. While about 130,000 people in Danzig were Catholic, only about 10 percent of them were Polish-speaking and the first attempts to reorganize the ecclesiastical allocation were made in spring 1919, when members of the German congregation asked for an affiliation to the Diocese of Warmia.

While these attempts were supported by the German government, the Polish government tried to preserve the current situation. Pope Pius XI decided to establish an Apostolic Administrator of the Free City of Danzig on 24 April 1922, which was directly subordinated to the Pope. In 1925 a concordat between Poland and the Holy See was signed and the Apostolic Administrator was now supposed to be subordinated to the Nuncio of Warsaw, which caused protests among the local populace. Thus the Pope established the exempt Diocese of Danzig on  30 December 1925 and appointed Edward O'Rourke as the first Bishop on 2 January 1926.

The Diocese was promoted as Metropolitan Archdiocese of Gdańsk on 25 March 1992. On 17 November 1993, the Archbishop issued the instructions on the status of Kashubian as a language of liturgy.

Reports of sex abuse

In 2019, three protestors toppled a statue of Rev. Henryk Jankowski following revelations that he sexually Barbara Borowiecka when she was a girl. Jankowski, who also had a criminal investigation involving the sexual abuse of a boy dropped against him in 2004, had been defrocked in 2005. However, he died in 2010 without ever being convicted of sex abuse. On 13 August 2020, Pope Francis removed Gdańsk Archbishop Sławoj Leszek Głódź, who was among those who covered up abuse committed by Jankowski and Cybula. Glodz had also presided over Cybula's funeral. Despite the fact that Glodz had just turned 75, the required age for Catholic Bishops to offer their resignation, the move was described as "cleaning house," as it is highly unusual for the Pope to accept such a resignation on a prelate's actual birthday.

Special churches

 Cathedral, Minor Basilica:
 Cathedral Basilica of The Holy Trinity
 Co-Cathedral, Minor Basilica:
 Co-Cathedral Basilica of the Assumption of the Blessed Virgin Mary
 Minor Basilicas:
St. Nicholas Basilica, Gdańsk
St. Brigid Basilica, Gdańsk

Leadership
Diocesan bishops
 1926–1938 - Edward O'Rourke (2 June 1926 – 13 June 1938)
 Apostolic Administrator of the Free City of Danzig, 1922–1926
 Carl Maria Splett (Karol Maria Splett) (13 June 1938 – 5 March 1964)
 arrested by the Polish communist government in 1945 and imprisoned; emigrated to Germany in 1956
 1945–1951 - Andrzej Wronka, apostolic administrator
 1951–1956 - Jan Cymanowski, vicar
 Edmund Nowicki (7 March 1964– 10 March 1971)
 coadjutor bishop, 1956–1964 
 Lech Kaczmarek (1 December 1971– 31 July 1984)
 Tadeusz Gocłowski (31 December 1984 – 25 March 1992)

Metropolitan bishops 
 Tadeusz Gocłowski (25 March 1992 – 17 April 2008)
 Sławoj Leszek Głódź (17 April 2008 – 13 August 2020)
 Tadeusz Wojda (2 March 2021 – present)

Auxiliary bishops
 1958–1971 – Lech Kaczmarek
 1972–1982 – Kazimierz Kluz
 1983–1984 – Tadeusz Gocłowski
 1985–2005 – Zygmunt Pawłowicz (retired in 2005)
 2005–2012 – Ryszard Kasyna
 since 2014 – Wiesław Szlachetka
 2015–2022 – Zbigniew Zieliński
 since 2022 – Piotr Przyborek

Suffragan dioceses
 Pelplin
 Toruń

See also
Roman Catholicism in Poland

References

External links
 GCatholic.org
 Catholic Hierarchy
  Diocese website

Roman Catholic dioceses in Poland
Christian organizations established in 1925
Archdiocese
Roman Catholic dioceses and prelatures established in the 20th century